The men's singles on 2016 European Table Tennis Championships were held in Budapest, Hungary from 18–22 October 2016. Venue for the competition is Tüskecsarnok.

Results

Finals

Top half

Bottom half

External links
Official website

2016 European Table Tennis Championships